Church of Saint Michael the Archangel is a church situated in Prague, Czech Republic. It was built in Romanesque and Gothic style and later rebuilt in Baroque style. The priest and church reformer Jan Hus celebrated masses in the church. The church and adjacent monastery were disestablished during the reforms of the Emperor Joseph II in the 18th century. Later, the buildings served as a warehouse. In the crypt, there are buried rectors of the Prague's University.

History
The Church of St. Michael in Opatovice – V Jirachářích, originally a Romanesque structure, is older than the New Town (Nové Město) itself, which started to evolve in the place of the fields and meadows, settlements and villages in 1348.

It was founded at the same time as the settlement of Opatovice and a rectory stood at the site during the reign of John of Bohemia. It belonged to the Hussites during the Hussite Wars (1419), became the property of the Lutherans a hundred years later (1524), and then the Catholics after the Battle of White Mountain (1621). It was then bought by the German Lutheran Church in 1790 after being abandoned.

The German choir had a picture of Martin Luther created for the side window of the church in 1915. After the Second World War, the confiscated church was passed to the Prague choir of the Slovak Evangelical Church. The Gothic structure of the church dates back to the last 25 years of the 14th century.

It was expanded and added to on a number of occasions, with its final re-Gothicisation dating back to 1914–1915 under the leadership of builder Štěpán Koloschek.

An oblong nave was created with a flat ceiling and a prismatic tower to the west. The irregular presbytery is distinctive for its ornate vaulting. The asymmetric three-naved structure is externally unified by an orbiting, Baroque, main cornice. The Baroque extension of a staircase to the gallery sits next to the southern Gothic nave. The structure comes to a peak with its slender prismatic tower, which has Gothic core. The portal from the north is fitted with a fanlight, whose tracery was made up of a number of stylized nuns. The late-Rococo main altar (around 1770) remains the Gothic fittings. This was originally dedicated to St. Michael.

References 

Churches in Prague 1
Baroque church buildings in the Czech Republic
Baroque architecture in Prague
Gothic architecture in the Czech Republic